49er or Forty-Niner most often refers to:
A miner or other person that took part in the 1849 California Gold Rush
San Francisco 49ers, an American football team
   
49er or Forty-Niner may also refer to:

Sports 
 Charlotte 49ers, athletic teams of the University of North Carolina at Charlotte
 Long Beach State 49ers, former official and oft-used informal nickname for the athletic teams of California State University, Long Beach
 Yuba 49ers, athletic teams of Yuba College
 49er (dinghy), an Olympic class of racing dinghy
 Forty Niner (horse), American Thoroughbred racehorse
 TKS 49ers, German basketball team at the southwest border of Berlin

Music 
 49ers (band), an Italian Italo house and Eurodance project
 49ers (album)
 The 49ers, an American hip-hop duo

Other 
 49er flapjack, a sourdough crepe
 UP 49ers, an engineering association in the University of the Philippines
 Top 10: The Forty-Niners, a novel by Alan Moore and Gene Ha
 The Forty-Niners, a group of shōjo manga artists also known as the Year 24 Group
 "The 49ers", a group of Cathay Pacific Airways pilots fired on 9 July 2001
 49er, the lowest initiated rank in a Triad
 A real ale brewed by the Ringwood Brewery with a strength, appropriately, of 4.9%
 A member of the 49th Battalion, CEF
 The Forty Niner or 49'er, a streamliner passenger train between San Francisco and Chicago operated by the Union Pacific Railroad
 Another name for Arsenal F.C.'s "Invincibles" who went 49 league games unbeaten
 Miner 2049er, a 1982 video game that reimagined the name

See also 
 49 (number)
Forty-Eighters, Europeans involved in the revolutions of 1848
Niner (disambiguation)
 29er (disambiguation)